Matt Wilson is a recently confirmed impact crater, elliptical in shape and situated in Gregory National Park about  north of the Victoria River Roadhouse in the Northern Territory, Australia.

See also

List of impact craters in Australia

References

Further reading 
 Kenkmann, T. Poelchau, M.H. 2007. Piccaninny, WA, and Matt Wilson, NT; two possible complex impact craters in Australia. Paper presented at the 17th annual V. M. Goldschmidt conference, Cologne, Federal Republic of Germany, 71(15), A477-A477

Impact craters of the Northern Territory
Geology of the Northern Territory
Precambrian Australia
Proterozoic impact craters